Girdhari Bhoi was an Indian politician who belonged to Ganatantra Parishad. He was elected to the Lok Sabha, the lower house of the Parliament of India from Kalahandi-Bolangir, Odisha.

References

External links
Official Biographical Sketch in Lok Sabha Website

1903 births
Year of death missing
Lok Sabha members from Odisha
India MPs 1952–1957